The Pir Huseyn Khanqah and Mausoleum lies along the left bank of Pirsaat River (Pirsaatçay), 126 kilometers to the southwest of Baku. The inscription plaque over the portal, read by V. Kratchkovskaya in 1952, announces that the khanqah (dervish monastery) was built by Sharaf al-Dawla wal-din Hasan during the reign of the Shirvanshah Afridhun Abul-Muzaffar Fariburz (Fariburz III, 1225–1255). The title gives a later date: "Here lies the sheikh, imam, mystic...Al-Husain, son of 'Ali, known as Pir Husain Rawanan...His tomb was rebuilt by 'Umar, son of Muhammad al-Shirzadi of Qazvin and completed in the year of 684 [1280 B.C.E.]." It is likely that the tomb of Pir Husayn bin Ali, an Azeri sheikh of the Qalandari sect who lived in the 11th century, existed on this site before a formal khanqah was built around it in the 13th century.

Built out of cut-stone, the roughly rectangular complex was centered on an open courtyard fortified with ramparts, similar to a ribat. The crenellated rampart walls were buttressed with round bastions at the corners and semi-circular bastions at the middle of the south, east and west walls. A monumental gate centered on the eastern wall gave access to the courtyard, which was surrounded with halls of different sizes to its north and west, including a mosque on the western wing and a single minaret near the northeastern corner.

The Pir Husayn Khanqah was renowned for the glazed tiles covering the interior of the tomb and the sheikh's sarcophagus, which had disappeared entirely by 1913. By the 1940s, more than four hundred of the tomb's cross and star-shaped tiles were identified by V. Kratchkovskaya at the Hermitage Museum (St. Petersburg) and the State Museum of Georgia (Tbilisi), including tiles from the inscriptive frieze of the mausoleum. Set in an array with plain cross-shaped tiles, each eight-sided star tile featured a unique composition of floral motifs and depictions of birds, horses and fish painted on a turquoise base and bordered with a single line of inscription on a white background. Given the absence of ceramic workshops in Shirvan Shahi territory in the thirteenth century, it is likely that the tiles were made by Persian artisans from Kashan or Tabriz.

Sources 
Aslanapa, Oktay. 1979. Kirim ve Azerbaycan'da Türk Eserleri. Istanbul: Baha Matbaasi, 84–92.
Fatullayev, S.S. and R.S. Babasov. 2005. "Memarliq". Maison d'Azerbaidjan Website. . [Accessed November 2, 2005]
Kratchkovskaya, V. A. 1946. Izraztsi Mavsoleia Pir-Khuseina. (Les Faiences du Mausolée de Pir-Houssein). Tbilisi: Académie des Sciences de la RSS de Géorgie.
Kratchkowskaja, V. 1952. "Texte de Construction: Chanakah Pir Husain." In Répertoire Chronologique d'Épigraphie Arabe, XI, 154-155 (no.4231).
Kratchkovskaja, V. 1954. "Texte de Construction: Khanakah Pir Husain." In Répertoire Chronologique d'Épigraphie Arabe, XIII, 45-46 (no.4865).
Wilber, Donald Newton. 1969. The Architecture of Islamic Iran: The Il Khanid Period. New York: Greenwood Press, 106–107.

Islam in Azerbaijan
Mausoleums in Azerbaijan
Sufi shrines
Tourist attractions in Azerbaijan